Su Chiu-cheng (1935–1998) was a Taiwanese politician. Until 1972, he was a practicing lawyer. Su was affiliated with the tangwai movement throughout his political career, and served as a member of the Legislative Yuan between 1981 and 1984.

Career
Su practiced rights law until he was convicted of embezzlement and disbarred in 1972. He became involved in politics as a legal consultant for political candidates affiliated with the tangwai movement. Su worked for Yu Teng-fa before participating in the 1979 Kaohsiung incident. He came to the attention of the Taiwan Garrison Command during the demonstrations, and was subsequently arrested. Su was released on bail and permitted to campaign for a legislative seat during the 1980 elections. He won a seat on the Legislative Yuan representing Kaohsiung. The seventh issue of Mingjen, a tangwai-affiliated magazine, was banned in October 1982, partly because it had covered a press conference attended by Su in Tokyo. In 1983, Su questioned interior minister Lin Yang-kang about the lifting of martial law in Taiwan. Su supported a number of legislative candidates during the 1986 election cycle, all of whom lost their bids for political office.

References

1935 births
1998 deaths
Members of the 1st Legislative Yuan in Taiwan
Kaohsiung Members of the Legislative Yuan
Prisoners and detainees of Taiwan
Taiwanese prisoners and detainees
20th-century Taiwanese lawyers
Human rights lawyers
Politicians convicted of embezzlement
Disbarred lawyers
Taiwanese politicians convicted of fraud